This is a list of mountain ranges of Greenland.

List by alphabetical order

Alángup Qáqai, located in SW Disko Island
Albert Heim Range (Albert Heim Bjerge), located in northern Hudson Land, north of Promenadedal.
Alexandrine Range (Alexandrine Bjerge), rising above the southeastern shore of Denmark Fjord.
Amitsorssûp Qulâ, located south of the Ameralik Fjord in West Greenland.
Barth Range (Barth Bjerge), located in Queen Margrethe II Land.
Borgtinderne, a long nunatak with multiple peaks east of the Ejnar Mikkelsen Range. Highest peak Borgetinde.
Brages Range (Brages Bjerge), located at the western end of Odinland in a nunatak between the Fimbul and Sleipner glaciers at the head of the Bernstorff Fjord.
Crown Prince Frederick Range (Kronprins Frederik Bjerge), very long range of nunataks stretching southwest of Kangerlussuaq Fjord, East Greenland.
Daly Range (Daly Bjerge), a subrange of the Roosevelt Range located in Peary Land.
Dannebrog Range (Dannebrogsfjeldene), chain of mountains and nunataks located in southwestern Queen Louise Land.
Didrik Pining Range (Didrik Pining Bjerge), located in Liverpool Land.
Dødemandstoppene (Danish for "Mountains of the Dead", lit. "Peaks of the Dead Men"), located in the Gronau Nunataks eastern zone.
Ejnar Mikkelsen Range (Ejnar Mikkelsen Fjeld), a long nunatak with multiple peaks east of the Watkins Range.
Ellemands Range (Ellemandsbjerge), located in Traill Island. 
Fynske Alps (Fynske Alper), located north of the head of Denmark Fjord.
Giesecke Range (Giesecke Bjerge), located in the east part of the Gauss Peninsula. 
Graah Mountains (Graah Fjelde), rise to the south of Kangerluluk fjord and are relatively free from snow.
Gronau Nunataks (Gronau Nunatakker), a group of nunataks located in the area of the Gronau Glacier.
Grønne Range (Grønnebjerge), located in Traill Island.
H. H. Benedict Range (H. H. Benedict Bjerge), a subrange of the Roosevelt Range located in Peary Land.
Halle Range (Hallebjergene), located in Clavering Island.
Häsi Mountains (Häsi Bjerge), located northwest of Nathorst Land.
Haug Range (Hauge Bjerge), located in Hall Land.
Heywood Range (Heywood Bjerge), located in Liverpool Land.
Hjelm Range (Hjelmbjergene), located on the southern coast of the Gauss Peninsula.
J. A. D. Jensen Nunataks near the west coast of Greenland.
Jyske Ridge (Jyske Ås), a ridge located south of Hagen Fjord.
Kangerluluk Range (Kangerluluk Bjerge), rising on the northern flank of Kangerluluk fjord.
Kangerlussuaq Peaks (Kangerlussuaq Tinder), located west of Kangerlussuaq Fjord, East Greenland.
Kloftbjerge, rising at the eastern end of Renland.
Klosterbjerge, located in Nathorst Land.
Knud Rasmussen Range (Knud Rasmussen Bjerge), located in West Greenland, south of Tycho Brahe Lake at the terminus of J.P. Koch Glacier.
Lacroix Range (Lacroix Bjerge), located in SW Andrée Land on the eastern flank of Isfjord.
Lemon Range (Lemon Bjerge), located east of Courtauld Glacier which has its terminus in an arm of Kangerlussuaq Fjord, East Greenland.
Lilloise Range (Lilloise Bjerge), located southeast of the Watkins Range in King Christian IX Land.
Lindbergh Range (Lindbergh Fjelde), nunatak group located west of the Christian IV Glacier.
Mary Peary Peaks (Mary Peary  Tinder), Roosevelt Range located in Peary Land.
Mols Range (Mols Bjerge), located in Traill Island.
Murchison Range, a subrange of the Stauning Alps.
Musk Ox Range (Moskusoksefjeldene), located in Germania Land.
Nordfjord Plateau, located to the northeast of Kangerlussuaq Fjord, East Greenland.
Nordkrone (Nordkronen), located in Peary Land. 
Norlund Alps (Nørlund Alper), located in northeastern Hudson Land, east of Stordalen.
Paul Stern Land, an area of nunataks located in the SW area of inner Scoresby Sound.
Pentamerus Range (Pentamerus Bjerge), located in far NW Greenland.
Pictet Range (Pictet Bjerge), located NW of Antarctic Haven, on the southern side of Davy Sound.
Prince of Wales Range (Prinsen af Wales Bjerge), located north of Kangerlussuaq Fjord, East Greenland.
Princess Caroline-Mathilde Alps (Prinsesse Caroline Mathilde Alper), located in Holm Land.
Princess Elizabeth Alps, located in Crown Prince Christian Land.
Qalorujoorneq, located in Kulusuk Island.
Qârusuit Range, located in the Nuussuaq Peninsula.
Qivssakatdlagfik, located in Itilleq Island.
Queen Louise Land (Dronning Louise Land), vast mountainous region located west of Dove Bay made up of several very large and numerous small nunataks.
Rasmussens Range (Rasmussens Bjerge), name sometimes used to refer to the northern part of the Watkins Range between the 69th parallel north and the Gronau Nunataks.
Rold Range (Rold Bjerge), located in Traill Island.
Roosevelt Range (Roosevelt Fjelde), located in Peary Land.
Roscoe Range (Roscoe Bjerge), located in Liverpool Land.
Schweizerland, located north of the head of Sermilik in King Christian IX Land.
Sioraq Range (Sioraq Fjelde), located near Tasiilaq.
Sjælland Range (Sjællands Fjelde), located south of the head of Denmark Fjord.
Skaermen (Skærmen), a long nunatak with multiple peaks west of the Watkins Range.
Skirnir Mountains, west of Sehested Fjord.
Sortebrae Range, located by the Sortebrae Glacier.
Søbjergene, located in Liverpool Land.
Stauning Alps (Stauning Alper), located in Scoresby Land. 
Svinhufvud Range (Svinhufvud Bjerge), located in Traill Island.
Tågefjeldene (Ingolf Fjord), located on the west side of inner Ingolf Fjord.
Tågefjeldene (Hold with Hope), located in the southern part of Hold with Hope.
Wager Nunataks (Wager Nunatakker), a group of nunataks located southwest of the Magga Dan Glacier.
Watkins Range, the highest point of Greenland is located in this range.
Werner Range (Werner Bjerge), located in Scoresby Land, east of the Stauning Alps.
Wiedemann Range (Wiedemann Bjerge), located in a nunatak stretching northwards at the head of the Wiedemann Fjord.

See also
 Geography of Greenland
 List of mountain peaks of Greenland
 List of mountains of Greenland
 List of mountain ranges#Greenland
 List of Nunataks#Greenland

References

External links
Greenland Expedition - Unclimbed Mountain Ranges

 
Greenland, Lists of mountain ranges
Geography of Greenland
Landforms of Greenland
Ranges